FVM may refer to:
 Finite volume method
 Five Mile Airport, in Alaska, United States
 Flugfélag Vestmannaeyja, a defunct Icelandic airline
 Fuvahmulah Airport, in Maldives
 Middle Rhine Football Association